Zamandosi Cele is a South African women's footballer and plays as a midfielder. She plays for Durban Ladies. She represented the South Africa women's national football team at the 2012 London Olympics

References

Living people
1990 births
Women's association football defenders
South African women's soccer players
South Africa women's international soccer players
Footballers at the 2012 Summer Olympics
Olympic soccer players of South Africa